Renato Balestrero (27 July 1898 – 18 February 1948) was an Italian racecar driver from Genoa, winning 54 out of 217 races between 1922 and 1947.

Born in Lucca, he lived in Genoa and was active in the first world war.  He started out in an Officine Meccaniche 665 winning the Coppa Ciano 1924 and  several events in the 1925 Grand Prix season and 1926 Grand Prix season, including the I Tripoli Grand Prix 1925.

He then bought a Bugatti T35C for 75 000 francs which he raced 1927 and 1929.  As an agent to General Motors he raced the newly launched La Salle (automobile) in 1928.  Other cars included a Talbot 1700 (1931), as well as Alfa Romeo 8C 2300, Alfa Romeo P3 and Fiat 1100 cars.

Since before the second world war, he ran the Scuderia Balestrero, which including himself, Giovanni Balestrero and Clemente Balestrero.  Since 1953 the Lucca-based Scuderia Balestrero has been active.

Balestrero died in the Niguarda Hospital of Milan, after being hit in a roadside accident by a Gazzetta dello Sport car. He was hauling an engine to the Nardi Danese workshop.

Racing record

Complete 24 Hours of Le Mans results

Complete European Championship results
(key) (Races in bold indicate pole position) (Races in italics indicate fastest lap)

References

Italian racing drivers
Grand Prix drivers
Mille Miglia drivers
Sportspeople from Genoa
Road incident deaths in Italy
1898 births
1948 deaths
European Championship drivers